Hillary Makasa (born 12 January 1972 and died on 6,October,2020) was a Zambian footballer. He once played for Nchanga Rangers.

International career
Makasa was part of the Zambian African Nations Cup squads in 1996 and 2000.

Clubs
1991–1999 :  Roan United
1990–2001 :  Ajax Cape Town FC
2001–2002 :  Ria Stars
2003–2004 :  Nchanga Rangers

Notes

External links
 

1976 births
Living people
Zambian footballers
Zambian expatriate footballers
Zambia international footballers
Nchanga Rangers F.C. players
1996 African Cup of Nations players
1998 African Cup of Nations players
2000 African Cup of Nations players
2002 African Cup of Nations players
Cape Town Spurs F.C. players
Expatriate soccer players in South Africa
Zambian expatriate sportspeople in South Africa
Association football defenders